This was the first edition of the event.

Michael Chang won the title, beating Greg Rusedski 7–6(7–5), 6–7(6–8), 6–4 in the final.

Seeds

Draw

Finals

Top half

Bottom half

References

External links
 Main draw

1993 ATP Tour